Wangjiawan is a village in the municipality of Fenxiang Town and part of the Yiling District, which itself is a part of the Yichang of Hubei province.

Geology

References

Geography of Yichang
Village-level divisions of Hubei